In Ovid's moralizing fables collected as Metamorphoses is his telling of the story of Baucis and Philemon, which stands on the periphery of Greek mythology and Roman mythology.  Baucis and Philemon were an old married couple in the region of Tyana, which Ovid places in Phrygia, and the only ones in their town to welcome disguised gods Zeus and Hermes (in Roman mythology, Jupiter and Mercury respectively), thus embodying the pious exercise of hospitality, the ritualized guest-friendship termed xenia, or theoxenia when a god was involved.

Story
Zeus and Hermes came disguised as ordinary peasants, and began asking the people of the town for a place to sleep that night. They had been rejected by all, "so wicked were the people of that land," when at last they came to Baucis and Philemon's simple rustic cottage. Though the couple was poor, their generosity far surpassed that of their rich neighbors, among whom the gods found “doors bolted and no word of kindness."

After serving the two guests food and wine (which Ovid depicts with pleasure in the details), Baucis noticed that, although she had refilled her guest's beech wood cups many times, the pitcher was still full (from which derives the phrase "Hermes' Pitcher"). Realizing that her guests were gods, she and her husband "raised their hands in supplication and implored indulgence for their simple home and fare." Philemon thought of catching and killing the goose that guarded their house and making it into a meal, but when he went to do so, it ran to safety in Zeus's lap. Zeus said they need not slay the goose and that they should leave the town. This was because he was going to destroy the town and all those who had turned them away and not provided due hospitality. He told Baucis and Philemon to climb the mountain with him and Hermes and not to turn back until they reached the top.

After climbing to the summit ("as far as an arrow could shoot in one pull"), Baucis and Philemon looked back on their town and saw that it had been destroyed by a flood and that Zeus had turned their cottage into an ornate temple. The couple's wish to be guardians of the temple was granted. They also asked that when time came for one of them to die, that the other would die as well. Upon their death, the couple were changed into an intertwining pair of trees, an oak and a linden, standing in the deserted boggy terrain.

Other versions
The story of Baucis and Philemon does not appear elsewhere in Greek mythology nor in any cult, but the notion of hospitality's sacred nature was widespread in the ancient world. After Lot and his wife had feasted them, two strangers were revealed as "two angels" (Genesis 19:1; the story is in the preceding chapter). Like the story of Baucis and Philemon, Lot and his family were told to flee to the mountains and not look back, before God destroyed the city that they were living in. In addition, Hebrews 13:2 reads "Do not neglect to show hospitality to strangers, for by doing that some have entertained angels without knowing it."

The possibility that unidentified strangers in need of hospitality were gods in disguise was ingrained in first century culture. Less than two generations after Ovid's publication, Acts 14:11-12 relates the ecstatic reception given to Paul of Tarsus and Barnabas as they ministered in the city of Lystra: "The crowds shouted 'The gods have come down to us in human form!'  Barnabas they called Zeus, and Paul they called Hermes."

In later texts
Nathaniel Hawthorne repeated the story of Baucis and Philemon in "The Miraculous Pitcher," a story in A Wonder-Book for Girls and Boys, 1851.
Jean de la Fontaine's poem follows Ovid closely.
John Dryden translated Ovid's poem in 1693.
Jonathan Swift wrote a poem on the subject of Baucis and Philemon in 1709.
Joseph Haydn wrote a marionette opera Philemon und Baucis, oder Jupiters Reise auf die Erde in 1773.
Baucis and Philemon are characters in the fifth act of Goethe's Faust II (1832).
Gogol wrote an ironic and bittersweet reworking of the legend in his 1835 novella The Old World Landowners.
Charles Gounod wrote his opéra comique Philémon et Baucis in 1860.
One of the cities in Italo Calvino's Invisible Cities (1972) is named after Baucis.
Charles Frazier's novel, Cold Mountain (1997), ends with a reading of this myth.
Film director Károly Makk sets his film Philemon és Baucis during the Hungarian uprising of 1956.
Referenced by Shakespeare in Much Ado About Nothing when Don Pedro courts Hero for Claudio (2.1.95), and also in As You Like It by Jaques (3.3.7-8).
Australian writer Ursula Dubosarsky published a play for children, The Goose Who Was Nearly Cooked based on the story of Philemon and Baucis.
Referenced in Nadja by André Breton.
Referenced in Thom Gunn's poem "Philemon and Baucis" in The Man with Night Sweats.
Barbey D'Aurevilly describes a couple as Philemon and Baucis in his short story "Happiness in Crime" from the collection Les Diaboliques.
The narrator in Max Frisch's 1964 novel Gantenbein refers to the main characters as Baucis and Philemon for a whole chapter.
Philemon (and occasionally Baucis) is a central protagonist in Carl Jung's revelatory text, the Red Book.
Referenced by Ezra Pound in the poem "The Tree" and in "Canto XC."
The Overstory by Richard Powers makes several references to the story and to the idea of gods' traveling incognito.
British writer Jenn Ashworth echos the myth of Baucis and Philemon in her 2016 supernatural novel Fell

See also
 Darby and Joan
 Hospitium
 Sodom and Gomorrah
 Xenia (Greek)

References

Notes

Sources

 Ovid VIII, 611–724. (On-line)
 Philemon and Baucis (2003).  Mythology: Myths, Legends, & Fantasies. :  
 Hall, James, Hall's Dictionary of Subjects and Symbols in Art, 1996 (2nd edn.), John Murray, 
 William Smith, ed. A Dictionary of Greek and Roman Biography and Mythology (1873)
 Harry Thurston Peck, Harper's Dictionary of Classical Antiquities (1898)
 

Metamorphoses into trees in Greek mythology
Greek mythological priestesses
Hermes in art
Metamorphoses
Metamorphoses characters
Deeds of Zeus
Deeds of Hermes